1997 Empress's Cup Final was the 19th final of the Empress's Cup competition. The final was played at National Stadium in Tokyo on January 18, 1998. Yomiuri-Seiyu Beleza won the championship.

Overview
Yomiuri-Seiyu Beleza won their 4th title, by defeating Prima Ham FC Kunoichi 1–0.

Match details

See also
1997 Empress's Cup

References

Empress's Cup
1997 in Japanese women's football